Rome–Constantinople schism may refer to:

Rome–Constantinople schism of 484, also known in Western sources as the Acacian Schism
Rome–Constantinople schism of 863, also known in Western sources as the Photian Schism
Rome–Constantinople schism of 1054, also known as the Great East-West Schism

See also
Moscow–Constantinople schism (disambiguation)
Orthodox schism (disambiguation)
 Schism (disambiguation)